Netiv HaAsara (lit. Path of the Ten) is a moshav in southern Israel. Located in the north-west Negev, it falls under the jurisdiction of Hof Ashkelon Regional Council.

History
The moshav was founded in 1982 by 70 families who were residents of the former Israeli settlement of Netiv HaAsara in the Sinai Peninsula, which was evacuated as a result of the Camp David Accords. The original moshav had been named for ten soldiers that were killed in a helicopter accident south of Rafah in 1971, and was originally named "Minyan".

After the Israeli disengagement from Gaza in 2005, Netiv HaAsara became the closest community in Israel to the Gaza Strip, located 400 meters away from the edge of the Palestinian town of Beit Lahiya. At the southern edge of the village, a car park was converted into an Israel Defense Forces base and tanks were deployed. An electric fence was erected to stop infiltration attempts from Gaza, and three concrete walls were built against potential Palestinian snipers.

The moshav was a target of Qassam rockets, Katyusha rockets, and mortar shellings, In 2007, the Popular Resistance Committees sent two guerrillas to infiltrate the moshav, but they were killed by the IDF. 

Dana Galkowicz, a 22-year-old Israeli-Brazilian woman, was killed on 14 July 2005 at Netiv HaAsara by a Qassam rocket. On 10 January 2007, a nine year old school girl was killed. On 10 March 2010, a Thai worker was killed.

Tourism

In the 2010s Netiv HaAsara became an increasingly popular tourist attraction among foreign visitors drawn to a community where ordinary life continues despite constant threat of rocket attacks from neighboring Gaza.  An observation platform designed by architect Zvi Pasternak - expected to open in spring 2018 - will enable visitors to see Gaza City to the south and Ashkelon to the north.

The Path to Peace wall mosaic art project and educational center is located on the border between Gaza and Israel at Netiv HaAsara.

References

External links
Official website 

Moshavim
Populated places established in 1982
Gaza envelope
Populated places in Southern District (Israel)
1982 establishments in Israel